Wallgren may refer to:

Arvid Wallgren (1889–1973), Swedish pediatrician
Elia (Wallgrén) (born 1961), bishop of the Finnish Orthodox Church
Gunn Wållgren (1913–1983), Swedish actress
Henning Wallgren (born 1968), Norwegian competitive shooter
Ingrid Wallgren (1923–2016), Swedish canoeist
Jocke Wallgren, drummer for Swedish band Amon Amarth
Karin Lundgren (née Wallgren; born 1944), Swedish sprinter
Monrad Wallgren (1891–1961), American politician
Thomas Wallgren (born 1958), Finnish philosopher, activist, and politician

See also
Wahlgren